The 1991 IAAF World Cross Country Championships was held in
Antwerp, Belgium, at the Linkeroever Racecourse on March 24,
1991.   A report on the event was given in The New York Times.

Complete results for senior men, junior men, senior women, junior women, medallists, 
 and the results of British athletes were published.

Medallists

Race results

Senior men's race (11.764 km)

†: Athlete marked in the results list as nonscorer.

Note: Athletes in parentheses did not score for the team result

Junior men's race (8.415 km)

Note: Athletes in parentheses did not score for the team result

Senior women's race (6.425 km)

Note: Athletes in parentheses did not score for the team result

Junior women's race (4.435 km)

Note: Athletes in parentheses did not score for the team result

Medal table (unofficial)

Note: Totals include both individual and team medals, with medals in the team competition counting as one medal.

Participation
An unofficial count yields the participation of 633 athletes from 51 countries.  This is in agreement with the official numbers as published.

 (6)
 (1)
 (7)
 (2)
 (25)
 (27)
 (3)
 (16)
 (1)
 (26)
 (1)
 (4)
 (5)
 (14)
 (3)
 (6)
 (28)
 (27)
 (14)
 (6)
 (4)
 (5)
 (19)
 (3)
 (18)
 (27)
 (4)
 (22)
 (27)
 (1)
 (13)
 (15)
 (19)
 (1)
 (19)
 (19)
 (7)
 (7)
 (17)
 (12)
 (2)
 (20)
 (27)
 (6)
 (16)
 (6)
 (28)
 (27)
 (2)
 (11)
 (7)

See also
 1991 IAAF World Cross Country Championships – Senior men's race
 1991 IAAF World Cross Country Championships – Junior men's race
 1991 IAAF World Cross Country Championships – Senior women's race
 1991 IAAF World Cross Country Championships – Junior women's race
 1991 in athletics (track and field)

References

External links
The World Cross Country Championships 1973-2005
GBRathletics

 
World Athletics Cross Country Championships
Cross Country Championships
International athletics competitions hosted by Belgium
Sports competitions in Antwerp
Iaaf World Cross Country Championships, 1991
Cross country running in Belgium
March 1991 sports events in Europe
1990s in Antwerp